Eleven22 Worship (formerly, Eleven22) is an American Christian music worship band from Jacksonville, Florida. Their group formed at Beach United Methodist Church, then moved to The Church of Eleven22. They have released three independently-made studio albums.

A lead member in the band, Gretchen Martin, launched The Church of Eleven22 as a non-denominational church in 2012 with her husband, Joby Martin. Joby serves as the lead pastor at the church, while Gretchen writes music and sings with the Eleven22 worship band. Together, Joby and Gretchen have created a highly populated church and an incredibly successful worship band.

Background of Eleven22 Worship
Eleven22 Worship is from Jacksonville, Florida, where they were established in 2010, with four members, Ben Williams, Jonathan Berlin, Gretchen Martin and Maria Dunlap, while they were attending Beach United Methodist Church. They eventually moved to their own church, The Church of Eleven22. The cause near and dear to the band is the McKenzie Noelle Wilson Foundation.

All of the services at Eleven22 begin and end with music from the talented group of artists in Eleven22 Worship. The band believes that through their music, the church body can properly respond in worship to the love and compassion of God that is evident throughout the gospel of Jesus Christ. The songs that are created and sung by Eleven22 Worship are meant to bring glory and honor to God, as they unpack the purity of His word.

Music history
The band started as a musical entity in 2010, with their first independently-made studio album, Fall On Your Altar. Their subsequent studio album, The Reason, was released on May 15, 2012. They released, Before All Things, on September 4, 2015.

Background of The Church of Eleven22 
The first and main campus location of The Church of Eleven22 was launched in 2012 off of Beach Blvd in Jacksonville, Florida. The church was built out of a former Walmart, creating great acoustics for Eleven22 Worship. Joby and Gretchen Martin established the church with the vision of creating a movement for all people to discover and deepen a relationship with Jesus Christ. The name Eleven22 stems from the Bible verse Mark 11:22. The Martins then decided to have each service begin at 11:22, in order to help members arrive on time. Since the establishment of their first location, Joby and Gretchen have successfully commenced numerous other locations across the South. In addition to the typical church services, Eleven22 provides kids groups, special needs groups, disciple groups, mission retreats, worship nights, and baptizing opportunities.

Mission of Eleven22 
The mission of Eleven22 is to build a community that is focused on glorifying God through Jesus, creating disciple-making disciples that together can transform society and spread the gospel to the ends of the Earth. Eleven22 has created a three-step plan to achieve their mission in just a few short years. The church strives to plant 1,000 churches, establish 100 long-term missionaries, and build 10 new campuses in the time frame of ten years. Along with the creation of new churches, Eleven22's mission included the launching of the Hope's Closet thrift store, which is located right next to the Beach Blvd. campus. This store advances Eleven22's vision by creating a retail atmosphere that provides charity to community projects and assists both local and global ministry programs.

Eleven22 core values 
The Church of Eleven22 is founded on four core values, which include biblical integrity, spirit-led courage, Christ-like Character, and sacrificial love. Each of these four values build the foundation of each song from Eleven22 Worship and are carried throughout every service and event led by the church.

The Church of Eleven22 locations 
The Church of Eleven22 has greatly expanded since its opening in 2012. Over the past couple of years, Joby and Gretchen Martin have succeeded in launching numerous churches all over Northeast Florida and Southern Georgia. Specifically, they have commenced campuses in Arlington, Baymeadows, Fleming Island, Jesup, Mandarin, North Jacksonville, Orange Park, San Pablo, St. Johns, Columbia Correctional, and Union Correctional.

Members
Current band members
 Ben Williams
 Gretchen Martin

Current pastor

 Joby Martin

Discography
Albums
 Fall On Your Altar (2010)
 The Reason (May 15, 2012)
 Before All Things (September 4, 2015)

References

External links
Official website

Musical groups from Florida
2010 establishments in Florida
Musical groups established in 2010